The Cebuano people are the largest subgroup of the  larger ethnolinguistic group Visayans, who constitute the largest Filipino ethnolinguistic group in the country. Their primary language is the Cebuano language, an Austronesian language. They originated in the province of Cebu in the region of Central Visayas, but then later spread out to other places in the Philippines, such as Siquijor, Bohol, Negros Oriental, southwestern Leyte, western Samar, Masbate, and large parts of Mindanao. It may also refer to the ethnic group who speak the same language as their native tongue in different parts of the archipelago. The term Cebuano also refers to the demonym of permanent residents in Cebu island regardless of ethnicity.

History

The earliest European record of Cebuanos was by Antonio Pigafetta of the Magellan expedition. He provided some descriptions of their customs as well as samples of the Cebuano language. Ferdinand Magellan was killed in Cebu during the Battle of Mactan against the forces of Lapulapu.

Later early Spanish colonists referred to the Cebuanos (and other Visayans) as the pintados ("the painted ones"), due to their widespread practice of tattooing to record battle exploits.

Culture and festivities

The majority of Cebuanos are Roman Catholic, with many in rural areas synchronizing Catholicism with indigenous Bisayan folk religion. A minority of Cebuanos (specifically those in Mindanao) are Muslim, or in mixed Chinese-Cebuano families, incorporate Catholic beliefs with aspects of Buddhism or Taoism.

Among the island's notable festivities are the Sinulog festival, which is a mixture of Christian and native cultural elements, celebrated annually every third week of January.

Language

The Cebuano language is spoken by more than twenty million people in the Philippines and is the most widely spoken of the Visayan languages. Most speakers of Cebuano are found in Cebu, Bohol, Siquijor, Biliran, Western and Southern Leyte, eastern Negros and most of northern, southeastern and western Mindanao.

See also

Demographics of the Philippines
Ethnic groups in the Philippines
Cebu
Cebuano language
Rajahnate of Cebu
 Tagalog people
 Kapampangan people
 Ilocano people
 Ivatan people
 Igorot people
 Pangasinan people
 Bicolano people
 Negrito
 Visayan people
 Aklanon people
 Boholano people
 Capiznon people
 Cuyunon people
 Eskaya people
 Hiligaynon people
 Karay-a people
 Masbateño people
 Porohanon people
 Romblomanon people
 Suludnon
 Waray people
 Lumad
Moro people

References